Damien Nadarajah (born 4 March 1968) is a Sri Lankan former first-class cricketer who played for Tamil Union Cricket and Athletic Club.

References

External links
 

1968 births
Living people
Sri Lankan cricketers
Tamil Union Cricket and Athletic Club cricketers
People from Jaffna